Puzzle Series is a series of puzzle video games by Hudson Soft.

Titles
Games in the main Puzzle Series brand are collected as numbered volumes according to platform.

DS Puzzle Series
Games in the DS Puzzle Series are:
 Vol. 1: JIGSAWPUZZLE, released March 23, 2006 in Japan
 Vol. 2: CROSSWORD, released March 23, 2006 in Japan
 Vol. 3: SUDOKU, released March 23, 2006 in Japan, later released as Sudoku Gridmaster in North America and Sudoku Master in Europe
 Vol. 4: KAKURO, released August 10, 2006 in Japan
 Vol. 5: SLITHERLINK, released November 16, 2006 in Japan (an unofficial translation patch providing English menus is now available)
 Vol. 6: ILLUST LOGIC, released November 16, 2006 in Japan
 Vol. 7: CROSSWORD 2, released November 16, 2006 in Japan
 Vol. 8: , released December 14, 2006 in Japan
 Vol. 9: SUDOKU 2 Deluxe, released December 21, 2006 in Japan
 Vol. 10: HITORI, released March 8, 2007 in Japan
 Vol. 11: NURIKABE, released March 8, 2007 in Japan
 Vol. 12: AKARI, released March 8, 2007 in Japan
 Vol. 13: KANJI PUZZLE, released March 29, 2007 in Japan

On October 5, 2007, Hudson began to phase out the Puzzle Series brand, announcing a new puzzle series for the Nintendo DS. The titles are:
 , released October 25 in Japan.
 , released on October 25 in Japan.
 , released March 6, 2008 in Japan
 , released May 29, 2008 in Japan,

DSiWare games
In 2009, Hudson began releasing DSiWare adaptations of some of its puzzle games:
 Sudoku 50! (Sudoku Student in America), adapted from Sudoku DS: Nikoli no Sudoku Ketteiban, released March 18, 2009 in Japan, June 26, 2009 in Europe
 Sudoku 150! (Sudoku Master in America), adapted from Sudoku DS: Nikoli no Sudoku Ketteiban, released March 18, 2009 in Japan, June 29, 2009 in America
 Illustlogic, adapted from Illustlogic DS + Colorful Logic, released April 15, 2009 in Japan
 , adapted from Illustlogic DS + Colorful Logic, released September 30, 2009 in Japan
 Sudoku Sensei, adapted from Sudoku DS: Nikoli no Sudoku Ketteiban, released January 15, 2010 in Europe,

Wii PUZZLE Series
Games in the Wii PUZZLE Series are:
 Vol. 1: SUDOKU, released March 21, 2007 in Japan. The game features a control scheme in which players use the Wii Remote to point and select a number and insert it into the space.
 Vol. 2: , released July 10, 2008 in Japan.

A Crossword game, presumed to be branded as a Puzzle Series game, was announced by Hudson at the Japanese Wii Preview event on September 14, 2006 with a projected release in March 2007, but was never released.

Jigsawpuzzle

Puzzle Series features a Jigsawpuzzle sub-brand, which includes:
  and {{nihongo|Jigsawpuzzle: Weekly Kits Calendar Collection|ジグソーパズルこねこめくり編|Jigsawpuzzle: Koneko Mekuri Hen}}for the Nintendo DS (both released August 3, 2006 in Japan), based on the Mekuri calendar brand by Japanese company Comin.
  for the Wii, based on the "Kyo no Wanko" segment on the Japanese morning show Mezamashi TV. The game was released in Japan on July 26, 2007. For 1-4 players.

Hudson stopped using Jigsawpuzzle branding for jigsaw puzzle games with the announcement of Jigsawpuzzle DS: DS de Meguru Sekai Isan no Tabi as part of a new puzzle series in October 2007.

3DS game
In 2011, Hudson released its final puzzle game, a Nintendo 3DS game collection of four Nikoli puzzles: Sudoku, Shikaku, Hashiwokakero and Light Up.

References

External links
  
 Illustlogic DS + Colorful Logic review at Eurogamer
 Puzzle Series Vol. 11: Nurikabe review at Eurogamer
 Puzzle Series Vol. 11: Nurikabe review at NTSC-uk
 Eurogamer's Top 50 Games of 2007: 20-11 - lists Puzzle Series Vol. 5: Slitherlink as #16
 Puzzle Series Vol. 5: Slitherlink review at Eurogamer
 Nintendo DS puzzle game reviews by Stuart Campbell - includes reviews of some Puzzle Series'' games

2006 video games
Hudson Soft games
Konami franchises
Nintendo DS games
Nintendo DS-only games
Puzzle video games
Video game franchises
Video games developed in Japan